Felony disenfranchisement in Virginia is a provision of the Virginia Constitution: "No person who has been convicted of a felony shall be qualified to vote unless his civil rights have been restored by the Governor or other appropriate authority".

Governor Glenn Youngkin will likely continue the more-or-less automatic restoration policy instituted by former governor Terry McAuliffe (whom Youngkin defeated in his election), who personally signed 168,000 orders restoring voting rights. The policy was continued by McAuliffe’s successor, Ralph Northam. The matter was a major issue in the 2017 Virginia gubernatorial campaign.

History
The 1830 Virginia constitution limited disenfranchisement to "infamous crimes", while its 1851 successor drafted by reformers added bribery and the 1870 charter targeted treason and corruption. The 1902 constitution contained a clause that disenfranchised Virginians convicted of numerous crimes, including "treason or of any felony, bribery, petit larceny, obtaining money or property under false pretenses, embezzlement, forgery, or perjury." The current constitution was adopted in 1972.

On 30 June 2014, Virginia Governor Terry McAuliffe officially removed application requirements for non-violent felons. Offenders with "violent/more serious" felonies were required to satisfy several conditions and appeal to the governor five years after the end of completing the sentence in order to regain voting rights.

On 22 April 2016, McAuliffe issued an executive order granting voting rights to every convicted felon in the state, violent and non-violent, who had been released from prison, on parole or probation.

The Virginia Supreme Court ultimately ruled, in a 4–3 decision, that McAuliffe's executive order was unconstitutional, and that restoring voting rights must be an individualized process. Terry McAuliffe now is restoring rights to "individuals who have been convicted of a felony and are no longer incarcerated or under active supervision . . . In addition to confirming completion of incarceration and supervised release, the SOC considers factors such as active warrants, pre-trial hold, and other concerns that may be flagged by law enforcement. . . . The Governor will review SOC's analysis of each individual’s record and will make the final decision on proposed candidates for restoration of rights."

McAuliffe noted that the next governor could have an entirely different policy on restoration of rights.

Proposed constitutional amendments
A number of amendments have been proposed to revamp the requirements for restoration of rights. In 2017, the Virginia Senate passed a constitutional amendment to permanently disenfranchise violent felons, with the Virginia General Assembly being empowered to decide what constitutes a violent felony, but this died in the Virginia House of Delegates Privileges and Elections committee. Delegate Greg Habeeb had introduced a more moderate proposal than that proposed by Thomas Norment.

References

Politics of Virginia
History of voting rights in the United States
Electoral restrictions
Right of prisoners to vote
Right of felons to vote